The South Branch Rancocas Creek is a  tributary of Rancocas Creek in Burlington County, New Jersey in the United States.
The South Branch Rancocas Creek drains an area of 144 square miles. Much of the upland agriculture within the Rancocas Creek basin lies inside the South Branch Rancocas Creek basin. It is also among the least developed parts of the Rancocas Creek watershed.

Tributaries
 Friendship Creek
 Southwest Branch Rancocas Creek
  Masons Creek
 Bobbys Run
  Cedar Run
 Beaverdam Creek
 Jade Run

See also
List of rivers of New Jersey
North Branch Rancocas Creek
Rancocas Creek
Southwest Branch Rancocas Creek

References

External links
 U.S. Geological Survey: NJ stream gaging stations

Rivers of Burlington County, New Jersey
Rivers of New Jersey
Tributaries of Rancocas Creek